Arthur Achiel Albert, Knight Blanckaert (born 2 August 1940 in Veurne), known by his stage name Will Tura, is a Belgian artist famous in Flanders and the Netherlands. Tura is a singer, musician (he plays the piano, guitar, drums, accordion and harmonica), composer and songwriter. He is married to Jenny Swinnen, with whom he has a son David (born 16 October 1974) and a daughter Sandy Tura (born 21 November 1975).

Career
Tura started singing when he was only nine years old, covering Gilbert Bécaud and Nat King Cole. Tura's first producer was Jacques Kluger, and later his son Jean Kluger.

Will Tura's first hit was Eenzaam zonder jou (Eng, Lonely without you) in 1963, for which he wrote the melody, and Ke Riema the text. In a newspaper survey, the song got elected the biggest hit in Flanders ever, and it has a place in the Eregallerij (an honorary gallery of the Flemish song, an initiative of Belgian copyright collective SABAM and radio station Radio 2) since the first edition in 2000.

Many hits followed in various musical styles, including rock 'n roll, gospel, country and rap (Moa vent toch, from 1992, in the West Flemish dialect). In 1984 he made a tribute album to Elvis Presley, together with Elvis' band. In 1992 he also released his first Tura in Symfonie, performing with a symphonic orchestra.

In 1987 Will records the album Ouvertura, together with the London Symphony Orchestra and Robert Groslot. In 2002 one of Tura's dreams came true, recording an album entitled De Mooiste Droom (Eng, the most beautiful dream) with the London Philharmonic Orchestra.

In 1988 Will had a car accident, and the song Mooi, 't leven is mooi (Eng, Beautiful, life is beautiful) about it becomes a megahit in Flanders, and becomes the most frequently played song of 1989 according to SABAM, with Clouseau's Anne in second place.

In 1990, various rock 'n roll artists from Flanders created Turalura, a tribute album for the artist. In 2005, Tura's 65th birthday was celebrated elaborately in the Flemish media, along with the release of the cd Viva Tura.

In 1993 Tura sang Ik mis je zo (Eng, I miss you so) and Hoop doet leven (Eng, Hope gives life) at the ceremony for the deceased King Baudouin of Belgium. In 2014 he reprised "Hoop doet leven" at the funeral of Queen Fabiola. At the engagement party of Prince Philippe and Princess Mathilde in 1999 he gave a mini-recital.

In 1995 Will was made cultural ambassador of Flanders.

Honours
Tura was appointed an Officer of the Belgian Order of the Crown in 1999. In 2001, he was raised into the Belgian nobility by King Albert II and given for life the Belgian noble title Ridder, translated into English as "Knight".

Trivia

 Tura has a cameo in the Suske en Wiske album De Krimson Crisis, where he is one of the famous Belgians fighting Krimson.
 Veurne has only three honorary citizens: Will Tura, Paul Delvaux and King Albert I of Belgium.
 After his car accident in 1988, the prognosis was that he could never jog again with his broken kneecap. However, in 2006 he still ran 5 to 8 kilometres daily.

Discography
Will Tura has a total of 128 album releases.

1960s
 Will Tura (1963)
 Will Tura nr 01 – Eerste Hits (1964)
 Will Tura (1964)
 Will Tura nr 02 (1965)
 Tura Hits (1965)
 At the piano – Will Tura plays Will Tura (1966)
 Uit het hart (1966)
 Will Tura nr 03 (1966)
 Will Tura nr 04 (1967)
 Tura story (1968)
 Will Tura nr 05 (1968)
 Will Tura nr 06 – Viva el amor (1968)
 Will Tura's eerste hits (1969)
 Will Tura nr 07 (1969)

1970s
 Will Tura nr 08 – Linda (1970)
 Will Tura nr 09 (1971)
 Will Tura nr 10 (1972)
 Witte Kerstmis (1973)
 Will Tura nr 11 (1973)
 This is Will Tura (1973)
 Portrait of Will Tura (1973)
 Will Tura nr 12 (1974)
 De wereldreis van kleine Jan (1974)
 Liefdeverdriet (1970)
 Will Tura : his life, his music (1975)
 Will Tura nr 13 (1975)
 Avond met Will Tura (1975)
 Lach ermee (1975)
 Will Tura Live (1976)
 Will Tura nr 14 (1976)
 Will Tura (1976)
 Will Tura in Nashville (1976)
 Kalender (1976)
 International (1976)
 Gouden plaat van Will Tura (1976)
 Will Tura (quality sound series) (1977)
 Will Tura nr 15 (1977)
 Vlaanderen mijn land (1977)
 20 jaar : 1957–1977 (1977)
 Will Tura nr 16 (1978)
 Will Tura (quality sound series) (1978)
 Hello moeders (1978)
 Vrolijk Kerstfeest, Gelukkig Nieuwjaar (1978)
 Liefdesliedjes Will Tura & Marva (1979)
 Stepping out (1979)
 The golden best of Will Tura (1979)
 Non stop dansen en zingen met Will Tura (1979)
 Will Tura (picturedisc) (1979)
 Hits a gogo (1979)
 In mijn caravan (1979)

1980s
 I love you (1980)
 Favoriete album vol 1 (1980)
 Laatste cowboy (1980)
 Mijn eerste successen (case with 3 lp's) (1980)
 Mijn eerste successen vol 2 (case with 3 lp's) (1980)
 Liedjes die ik graag gezongen had (1955–1960) (1980)
 Liefdeverdriet (1980)
 Tura 81 (1981)
 Liedjes die ik graag gezongen had (1960–1965) (1981)
 Favorieten album vol 2 (1981)
 Toppers van Tura 1 (1982)
 Toppers van Tura 2 (1982)
 25 jaar Tura – 22 allergrootste successen (1982)
 Liefdeverdriet vol 1 (1982)
 Tura 82 (1982)
 Mijn grootste successen (1983)
 Tura 83 (1983)
 Seventies collectie (1984)
 Will Tura 1957–1964 (1984)
 Will Tura zingt Elvis Presley (1984)
 Tura 84 (1984)
 Waar een Will is,… (1985)
 Tura 85 – in concert (1985)
 Tura 87 (1986)
 Will Tura Hitrevue (1986)
 12 Tura toppers (1986)
 Ik zing alleen voor jou (1987)
 Een uur met Tura (1987)
 Ouvertura – Robert Groslot (1987)
 Tura 2000 (1988)
 Vlaanderen (1988)
 De sixties collectie (1989)
 De seventies collectie (1989)
 Tura vandaag (1989)

1990s
 16 voor Tura (1990)
 Live concert Veurne (1990)
 Turalura, rockers zingen Tura (1990)
 1991 – karaoke jij zingt de hits van Tura (1991)
 Mijn allereerste successen (1991)
 Nieuwe wegen (1991)
 Rock 'n roll in mijn hart (1991)
 Tura in symfonie I (1992)
 Moa ven toch (1992)
 Hoop doet leven (1993)
 Grootste hits 1973–1993 (1993)
 Vrolijkste liedjes 1973–1993 (1994)
 20 jaar tura (3 cd's) (1994)
 Tura in symfonie II (1994)
 Herinneringen 1973–1993 (1994)
 Double gold (2 cd's) (1994)
 Bloed, zweet & tranen (1995)
 Tura in studio (1995)
 Tura in symfonie III (1996)
 Europa (1996)
 Tura in harmonie (concertband voor Vlaanderen) (1997)
 Puur Tura (1997)
 40 jaar – 60s–70s–80s–90s (1997)
 Tura in Vorst (2 cd's) (1998)
 Alleen gaan & de mooiste slows '87–'97 (1998)
 Tura gospel & kerst (1999)

2000s
 Tura gospel (2000)
 ECI Premium (ware liefde) (2000)
 Ware liefde (2000)
 Tura collectie 1 (2001)
 Tura collectie 2 (2001)
 Tura collectie 3 (2001)
 Tura collectie 4 (2001)
 Tura collectie 5 (2001)
 Tura collectie 6 (2001)
 Terugblik 1 (2001)
 Terugblik 2 (2001)
 Terugblik 3 (2001)
 Terugblik 4 (2001)
 Terugblik 5 (2001)
 Terugblik 6 (2001)
 Het beste van Will Tura (2 cd's, 2001)
 De mooiste droom (2002)
 Gospel live! CD & DVD (2002)

References

External links
 

1940 births
Living people
People from Veurne
Belgian male singers

Belgian knights
Officers of the Order of the Crown (Belgium)